Dunaj may refer to:

 Dunaj (wine), a variety of red grape grown mostly in Slovakia and bred by Dorota Pospíšilová in 1958 as a mixture of (Muscat Bouschet x Oporto) x St. Laurent
 Dunaj (band), a progressive rock band from the Czech Republic
 Dunaj, Krško, a small settlement in the Municipality of Krško in Slovenia
 Dunaj, Masovian Voivodeship, a Polish village
 Dunaj, Moravče, a former settlement in the Municipality of Moravče in Slovenia
 The Slovene name for Vienna
 Slavic names for the Danube River

See also
 Dunay (disambiguation)